In Tongues is the debut full-length record by blackened death metal/deathcore band Dark Sermon. The album was released in North America through eOne Music on March 26, 2013 and in Europe through Nuclear Blast Records on April 12, 2013. The album was recorded at Audiohammer Studios and produced by Eyal Levi, formerly of Dååth, who has worked with Misery Index, Arsis. Two music videos were serviced for this album for "Hounds" and the title track "In Tongues". The artwork was designed and illustrated by Eliran Kantor (Hatebreed, Testament).

Track listing

2013 albums
Nuclear Blast albums
Dark Sermon albums
Albums with cover art by Eliran Kantor